1 Canis Minoris is a single star in the equatorial constellation of Canis Minor, located about 287 light years away from the Sun. It is visible to the naked eye as a faint, white-hued star with an apparent visual magnitude of 5.37.

Cowley et al. (1969) listed a stellar classification of A5 IV for 1 Canis Minoris, matching an A-type subgiant star that has exhausted the hydrogen at its core and is evolving into a giant. However, Gray and Garrison (1989) catalogued it as an A-type main-sequence star with a class of A4 V. The Hipparcos team used a class of A3 Vn, where the 'n' indicates "nebulous" lines due to rapid rotation.

This star is estimated to be 716 million years old and is at or near the end of its main sequence lifetime. It has a high rate of spin, showing a projected rotational velocity of 159 km/s. The star has more than double the mass of the Sun with about 4.6 times the Sun's radius. It is radiating 66 times the Sun's luminosity from its photosphere at an effective temperature of 8,374 K.

References

A-type subgiants
A-type main-sequence stars
Canis Minor
Durchmusterung objects
Canis Minoris, 01
058187
035987
2820